Ranjit Nayak (born 28 April 1968) is a senior staff member of the World Bank and serves as the chief adviser to the Government of North Macedonia on international and European Union affairs. In this role, he supports the ongoing work of the European Secretariat of the Government towards EU integration. Nayak previously served as the World Bank's Lead (Principal) Social Development Specialist for the Europe and Central Asia Region in Washington, D.C. from 2011 to 2013, where he oversaw social development operations in 30 countries, advised governments and World Bank partners on development issues, and led and mentored senior sector specialists within the Bank. Prior to that he served as the World Bank's country chief for Kosovo from 2007 to 2011, and is credited with ensuring the economic and financial sustainability of Kosovo after its declaration of independence in 2008.

Background
Ranjit Nayak was born on 28 April 1968 in Sambalpur, Odisha, India. He is the elder son of former member of Rajya Sabha and former secretary to Government of India, Radhakant Nayak

Education
During his early years in Odisha, he attended Kendriya Vidyalaya (Central School) in Bhubaneswar, a Government of India sponsored school for the children of public service officials. He is among a few notable alumni of the school.  He later studied Physics, Chemistry and Mathematics in BJB College (Affiliated to Utkal University) before moving to Delhi where he attended Hindu College (University of Delhi), earning a degree in Sociology (BA Honours) and Economics in 1989.

He completed his Masters in Sociology at the JNU in 1991 while simultaneously pursuing MA-level courses in Public Administration and International Relations. As part of his dissertation, Nayak spent time researching poverty as a participant observer in the slums of New Delhi. Nayak is a notable alum.

He continued his post-graduate studies at Cambridge University, funded by a series of scholarships from the university and the Indian Government. These included the prestigious Government of India B. R. Ambedkar National Scholarship for Social Justice.

Nayak obtained two post-graduate degrees from Cambridge, an MPhil and PhD in Social Anthropology, as a member of King's College. His MPhil involved research on development-induced displacements of minority populations, including the Kisan, Khadia and Oraon people of eastern India. His PhD, which included more than a year of lived experience among the Kisan tribe of Orissa, Jharkhand and Chhattisgarh states, respectively, involved an examination of human rights, livelihoods and welfare economics.

Throughout his career and education, Nayak has proven himself as a macroeconomist, especially while serving in senior positions with the World Bank Group. He has represented the institution at the highest level in a country, managed business portfolios worth billions of dollars, led macroeconomic policy dialogue with governments at the highest levels and coordinated partnerships with multilateral and bilateral institutions.

Career
Ranjit Nayak joined the World Bank in 2000 as a Young Professional (the Bank Group's internationally competitive leadership program) and has since worked in various parts of the Bank Group, including the International Finance Corporation (IFC), the International Bank for Reconstruction and Development (IBRD) and the International Development Association (IDA). Before joining the World Bank, Nayak served the United Nations in Geneva, non-governmental organisations in Europe and Eastern Europe, and the academia in India and the United Kingdom.

In a period close to three decades, Nayak has either lived or worked in over 27 countries spanning Eastern Europe, Latin America and the Caribbean, East Asia and the Pacific, and South Asia. His expertise covers diverse sectors and themes such as energy, transport, environment, education, employment, agriculture and finance. He has served in varied environments affected by poverty, fragility of institutions, conflict, economic instability, transition and challenging political regimes.

Nayak has seen through Kosovo's independence on 17 February 2008 and the enforcement of its constitution in June 2008. He has played an important role in facilitating the process of Kosovo's membership at the World Bank. Kosovo became the newest member of the five World Bank Group institutions on 29 June 2009, when Kosovar President Fatmir Sejdiu and Prime Minister Hashim Thaçi signed the Articles of Agreement of the International Bank for Reconstruction and Development and four other agencies of the World Bank Group.

Nayak has been actively engaged in assisting Kosovo's development efforts. He has been outspoken on the challenges of a new, fragile and post-conflict state. Nayak has been articulate on institutional weaknesses, including technical capacity, organisational structures, public institutions, civil society, NGOs and the media, business culture and corruption. He has been able to harness global knowledge towards the development of the young State of Kosovo. Nayak has led the work in many sectors such as finance, energy,, mining, climate change education, and transport.

Nayak has been involved in the development of dialogue in many high-level forums and ensured partnerships with organisations such as United States Agency for International Development, the European Commission, the International Monetary Fund, bilateral and multilateral agencies, and NATO (KFOR). He has been a promoter of democratic and multiethnic institutions in a region that features ethnic tensions. Nayak has been conscious of the role of the youth and the physically challenged in economic development. He is also active on the European lecture circuit. Nayak has remained committed to drawing investments to Kosovo's private sector and channeling it to the country's economic growth. In an interview with the BBC, he acknowledged the impact of the global financial crisis in certain sectors but remained optimistic about the future.

Nayak has acquired his professional experience in Afghanistan, Albania, Bangladesh, Bulgaria, Croatia, Czech Republic, France, Germany, India, Indonesia, Iraq, Kosovo, Kuwait, Mexico, Nepal, North Macedonia, Pakistan, Peru, Romania, Russia, Sri Lanka, Switzerland, the United Kingdom and the United States of America. He has published in the areas of resettlement and migration, post-conflict reconstruction, informal labor market, youth, corporate social responsibility, forestry, food policy, indigenous peoples, governance, and human rights. Prior to joining the World Bank, Nayak served in the United Nations in Geneva (Switzerland), Jawaharlal Nehru University in New Delhi (India), Food-First Information and Action Network in Heidelberg (Germany), and the Institute of Development Policy and Management in Manchester (United Kingdom), among others.

Sustainable Peace in Conflict Affected Areas 
Nayak's contribution to the existence of Kosovo as a sustainable state has been substantial. He has led a series of measures to ensure that peace was sustainable in the fragile Balkan environment, e.g., membership of Kosovo in international bodies, focus on accelerated economic development, strengthening weak institutions, harnessing of global knowledge to local problems, and special focus on certain sectors deserving urgency such as crumbling infrastructure particularly transport, development of natural resources that led to sustainable mining practices, efficient energy production, etc. The most critical of his contribution has been the raising of $1.5 billion in donor funds with the help of various donor agencies towards Kosovo's first budget as an independent state.

Anti-Poverty 
Beyond Kosovo, Nayak has worked on addressing issues surrounding poverty in South Eastern Europe along with DFID, IMF and the Hellenic Fund; and at - a local or municipal level – such as remote parts of the Balkan States. The aim has been to integrate "macro" and "micro" - economic and social policies.

Healthier Environment 
Nayak has been an advocate for a healthier and sustainable environment; one that relies on regenerating greener ecosystems and promoting green and renewable energy.

Good Governance 
Nayak has stood up against the widespread corruption in government institutions that keeps citizens in poverty and deprives them of a government that is meant for their wellbeing. In an investigative report in Foreign Policy, Nayak is alleged to have positioned himself against the interests of a corrupt government as the World Bank Representative. The alleged corruption was on a major European highway, and indicates the absence of a commitment to good governance by the Government and the private construction companies that were involved in the project.

Knowledge and Innovation 
Nayak has been recognised for his contribution to knowledge and innovation. He has received citations for his contribution. In one of his public speeches on education, he argues that education policies should promote overall learning for young learners that goes beyond classroom-based learning – that integrates with learning from peers, family, community, a variety of institutions, and the social space within which one lives. Nayak has led research on guiding South European countries to improving the environment for fostering cutting edge innovations. A World Bank paper published in 2011 on Regional Research and Design Strategy for Innovation in the Western Balkan Countries, which Nayak has guided, identifies key issues and implication of technical assistance.

Informal Exploitative Labour 
Nayak has published in the area of exploitative informal labour, particularly on harmful child labour, for the International Finance Corporation. Nayak discusses the implication of such labour in the private sector and how private companies can go about detecting it in the supply chain and addressing it towards sound labour practices. This has been considered as good practice for private firms.

Forced Resettlement 
Nayak has researched and published on refugees and displaced populations and ecological habitats. His proposition is that the forced dislocation of human, animal and plant ecosystems due to the execution and establishment of large infrastructure projects cannot easily offset: the loss of livelihoods, destruction of living ecosystems, and adverse mental and physical traumas. Hence, these projects must be thought out from all dimensions including ethical ones.

Development with Diversity and Inclusion 
During his tenure in South Eastern Europe, Nayak has campaigned for the inclusion of minorities of all types – economic, social, ethnic, religious, linguistic, and gender, in development projects. An example of his initiative was with the Deputy Prime Minister of Kosovo in 2011, when he found an innovative way of working against the discrimination of minority Serb communities by the majority Albanian communities by incentivising micro-development programs that enabled both communities to work together for shared financial and economic gains. In the long run this has fostered peace that has been sustainable.

Nayak is an advocate for the inclusion of economically, socially and politically disadvantaged minorities in the broader development and welfare schemes. He is the co-author of a report on the Roma in Bulgaria entitled "Gender Dimensions of Roma Inclusion" that serves to guide national policy on social inclusion in Bulgaria. The study reveals the complex relationship between minorities and majorities within the European Union, and how the understanding the internal worlds of minorities and discriminated groups is a first step towards effective policies and programmes.

Nayak has striven for diversity in the institutions that he has led or served. He is the recipient of the World Bank's Corporate Diversity and Inclusion Award in 2006 after he led the recruitment of the Bank's most diverse Young Professionals ever in its history. Nayak has a history of searching for talent globally. Here is an example of his work in Sydney, Australia.

Alternative Future 
Nayak is an exponent for a value-oriented global arrangement that focuses on economic growth, quality of life, and environmental sustainability, while incorporating values that underline morality, ethical economics and adverse climate mitigation. His position is captured in an invited talk on "The Economy of Tomorrow" organised by the Friedrich Ebert Stiftung and the National Institute of Social Work and Social Sciences in India. Nayak argues that the sharing of good, ethical, moral and humane values should be an intrinsic part of our socialisation and learning across formal and informal institutions. This would help us shape a better human future.

Achievements and awards
Ranjit Nayak has received awards and citations from development institutions, the academia and the military, including NATO (The KFOR General's Medal). Nayak has been the recipient of awards for his peace-building efforts in Russia, Afghanistan and Southeast Europe. He has published and spoken extensively in the fields of poverty, labor, infrastructure, finance, migration, environment, and human rights.

Nayak's media engagements have included the BBC, Voice of America, the Financial Times and the Washington Post. He is currently working on a documentary film entitled "The Making of Kosovo", about how citizenry contributes to the development of democracy and state-building.

References

World Bank Group people
Living people
1968 births
Kendriya Vidyalaya alumni
Hindu College, Delhi alumni
Alumni of King's College, Cambridge